Krzysztof Soszyński (born August 2, 1977) is a Polish–Canadian actor and retired mixed martial artist. An 11-year competitor from 2003 until 2014, Soszynski fought in the UFC, Strikeforce, the Los Angeles Anacondas of the IFL, and was a contestant on The Ultimate Fighter: Team Nogueira vs. Team Mir.

Background
Soszynski was born in Stalowa Wola, Poland, where he was raised until the age of ten, when his family moved to Winnipeg, Manitoba, Canada. Soszynski played football and soccer for Maples Collegiate, but later turned to weight training at the age of 16 before transitioning into bodybuilding and later professional wrestling. During his brief career in professional wrestling, which he began at the age of 21 and ended at the age of 25, Soszynski learned various judo techniques as well as submissions from fellow professional wrestler Bad News Brown, a bronze medalist in Judo at the 1976 Olympic games. After this, Soszynski began to pursue a career in mixed martial arts and also trained in Brazilian jiu-jitsu under black belt and gym owner, Rodrigo Munduruca, in Winnipeg. Soszynski also worked as a houseman at the Fairmont Winnipeg Hotel and as a promoter of local MMA events in Manitoba.

Mixed martial arts career

The Ultimate Fighter
Soszynski entered The Ultimate Fighter, where he defeated Mike Stewart and Kyle Kingsbury on the way to the semifinals, where he lost to Brazilian jiu-jitsu specialist Vinny Magalhaes.

Ultimate Fighting Championship
Soszynski made his debut against former Ultimate Fighter castmate Shane Primm, whom he defeated by submission due to a kimura. It was awarded Submission of the Night.

His second fight was at UFC 97 where Soszynski again utilized the kimura to win his second consecutive Submission of the Night award by forcing former WEC Light heavyweight Champion Brian Stann to tap to the hold.

Soszynski next stepped in as a late replacement for Houston Alexander at UFC 98, knocking out Andre Gusmão at 3:17 in the first round.

Soszynski then stepped in as a replacement for an injured Matt Hamill to fight Brandon Vera at UFC 102 in Portland, Oregon. Soszynski lost via unanimous decision, bringing his UFC record down to 3–1.

Soszynski next faced Stephan Bonnar on February 21, 2010, at UFC 110. Soszynski was victorious via third-round TKO due to a cut, though the victory was shadowed by an accidental headbutt that caused the cut, creating controversy over the victory. The New South Wales Sports Combat Authority overlooked the fight which could have resulted in the decision being overturned, depending on the judges' scorecards after round two. However, they ruled against overturning the decision. Both fighters stated that there was the need for a rematch.

Their wish was later granted as the two had their rematch at UFC 116. In a close stand up battle, Soszynski got caught by a knee from Bonnar in the second round and lost via TKO after taking several unanswered punches. The fight was awarded Fight of the Night alongside the Leben/Akiyama fight, giving all the fighters an extra $75,000 to their pay.

Soszynski faced Goran Reljic on November 13, 2010, at UFC 122. He won the fight via unanimous decision.

Soszynski was scheduled to face Anthony Perosh on June 11, 2011, at UFC 131.  However, Perosh was forced from the bout with an injury and replaced by Igor Pokrajac.  Pokrajac was also injured and replaced by returning UFC veteran Mike Massenzio. He defeated Massenzio via unanimous decision (30–27, 30–26, and 30–27).

Soszynski/Pokrajac took place on December 10, 2011, at UFC 140. Soszynski was staggered early on with a straight right from Pokrajac, who followed him to the ground where he landed several shots that finished Soszynski off, resulting in a KO loss. Soszynski was unresponsive for a few minutes after the fight. In a video blog by Dana White, president of the UFC, leading up to UFC 141, there was footage of Soszynski following his loss to Pokrajac and was seen claiming that he is retiring from MMA.  Later, he claimed he has no memory of what occurred in the video and says his future in MMA fighting will be dependent upon what his doctors say.

On August 15, 2014, Krzysztof announced his retirement from MMA competition on Inside MMA, citing memory problems that began occurring after his last fight.

Film career

Aside from his appearance on The Ultimate Fighter TV show, Soszynski had a small uncredited role in an episode of CSI: Crime Scene Investigation entitled "S.F.C. - Cage Fighter".

Soszynski made an appearance in the movie Here Comes the Boom as a top MMA fighter in the UFC by the name of Ken "The Executioner" Dietrich. He then landed a major role in the movie Tapped Out (2014).  He starred as Alpha in the 2016 Daylight's End. Soszynski had a role in the 2017 movie Logan.

Personal life
Soszynski is married and has a son from a previous relationship.

Soszynski initially worked as a coach at UFC Gym Torrance, and is currently the Director of MMA and Fitness for UFC Gym Middle East.

Soszynski has also been acting as a color commentator of Konfrontacja Sztuk Walki as of 2020.

Championships and achievements
Ultimate Fighting Championship
Submission of the Night (Two times) vs. Shane Primm, Brian Stann
Fight of the Night (One time) vs. Stephan Bonnar

Mixed martial arts record

|-
| Loss
| align=center| 26–12–1
| Igor Pokrajac
| KO (punches)
| UFC 140 
| 
| align=center| 1
| align=center| 0:35
| Toronto, Ontario, Canada
| 
|-
| Win
| align=center| 26–11–1
| Mike Massenzio
| Decision (unanimous)
| UFC 131 
| 
| align=center| 3
| align=center| 5:00
| Vancouver, British Columbia, Canada
| 
|-
|  Win
| align=center| 25–11–1
| Goran Reljic
| Decision (unanimous)
| UFC 122
| 
| align=center| 3
| align=center| 5:00
| Oberhausen, Germany
| 
|-
| Loss
| align=center| 24–11–1
| Stephan Bonnar
| TKO (knee and punches)
| UFC 116
| 
| align=center| 2
| align=center| 3:08
| Las Vegas, Nevada, United States
| |
|-
| Win
| align=center| 24–10–1
| Stephan Bonnar
| TKO (doctor stoppage)
| UFC 110
| 
| align=center| 3
| align=center| 1:04
| Sydney, Australia
| 
|-
| Loss
| align=center| 23–10–1
| Brandon Vera
| Decision (unanimous)
| UFC 102
| 
| align=center| 3
| align=center| 5:00
| Portland, Oregon, United States
| 
|-
| Win
| align=center| 23–9–1
| André Gusmão
| KO (punches)
| UFC 98
| 
| align=center| 1
| align=center| 3:17
| Las Vegas, Nevada, United States
| 
|-
| Win
| align=center| 22–9–1
| Brian Stann
| Submission (kimura)
| UFC 97
| 
| align=center| 1
| align=center| 3:53
| Montreal, Quebec, Canada
| 
|-
| Win
| align=center| 21–9–1
| Shane Primm
| Submission (kimura)
| The Ultimate Fighter: Team Nogueira vs. Team Mir Finale
| 
| align=center| 2
| align=center| 3:27
| Las Vegas, Nevada, United States
| 
|-
| Win
| align=center| 20–9–1
| Marcus Hicks
| Submission (kimura)
| UCW 11: Hell in the Cage
| 
| align=center| 1
| align=center| N/A
| Winnipeg, Manitoba, Canada
| 
|-
| Win
| align=center| 19–9–1
| Alex Andrade
| DQ (low blows)
| Ring of Combat 18
| 
| align=center| 2
| align=center| 4:46
| New Jersey, United States
| 
|-
| Win
| align=center| 18–9–1
| Robert Villegas
| DQ (refusal to fight)
| HDNet Fights: Reckless Abandon
| 
| align=center| 2
| align=center| 3:15
| Texas, United States
|Return to Light Heavyweight.
|-
| Loss
| align=center| 17–9–1
| Ben Rothwell
| TKO (punches)
| IFL: 2007 Semifinals
| 
| align=center| 1
| align=center| 0:13
| New Jersey, United States
| 
|-
| Loss
| align=center| 17–8–1
| Reese Andy
| Decision (split)
| IFL: Everett
| 
| align=center| 3
| align=center| 4:00
| Everett, Washington, United States
| 
|-
| Win
| align=center| 17–7–1
| Dan Christison
| Decision (unanimous)
| IFL: Los Angeles
| 
| align=center| 3
| align=center| 4:00
| California, United States
| 
|-
| Loss
| align=center| 16–7–1
| Mike Whitehead
| Decision (unanimous)
| IFL: Championship Final
| 
| align=center| 3
| align=center| 4:00
| Connecticut, United States
| 
|-
| Win
| align=center| 16–6–1
| Devin Cole
| Submission (armbar)
| IFL: World Championship Semifinals
| 
| align=center| 2
| align=center| 1:14
| Oregon, United States
| 
|-
| Win
| align=center| 15–6–1
| Icho Larenas
| TKO (doctor stoppage)
| TKO 27: Reincarnation
| 
| align=center| 3
| align=center| 0:00
| Montreal, Quebec, Canada
| 
|-
| Win
| align=center| 14–6–1
| Tom Howard
| TKO (punches)
| IFL: Portland
| 
| align=center| 1
| align=center| 3:47
| Portland, Oregon, United States
| 
|-
| Win
| align=center| 13–6–1
| Yan Pellerin
| Submission (kimura)
| TKO 26: Heatwave
| 
| align=center| 1
| align=center| 1:30
| Quebec, Canada
| 
|-
| Loss
| align=center| 12–6–1
| Ben Rothwell
| TKO (punches)
| IFL: Legends Championship 2006
| 
| align=center| 1
| align=center| 3:59
| New Jersey, United States
| 
|-
| Draw
| align=center| 12–5–1
| Mike Kyle
| Technical Draw
| Strikeforce: Shamrock vs. Gracie
| 
| align=center| 1
| align=center| 2:02
| California, United States
|  
|-
| Loss
| align=center| 12–5
| Brian Schall
| TKO (punches)
| TKO 24: Eruption
| 
| align=center| 3
| align=center| 3:00
| Quebec, Canada
|Return to Heavyweight.
|-
| Loss
| align=center| 12–4
| Martin Desilets
| TKO (doctor stoppage)
| TKO 23: Extreme
| 
| align=center| 2
| align=center| 1:30
| Quebec, Canada
| 
|-
| Loss
| align=center| 12–3
| Matt Horwich
| Submission (rear-naked choke)
| Freedom Fight: Canada vs. USA
| 
| align=center| 2
| align=center| 0:52
| Quebec, Canada
|Light Heavyweight debut.
|-
| Win
| align=center| 12–2
| Ron Fields
| Submission (armbar) 
| UCW 2: Caged Inferno   	
| 
| align=center| 1
| align=center| 2:25
| Winnipeg, Manitoba, Canada
| 
|-
| Win
| align=center| 11–2
| Jason Day
| TKO (punches)
| RR 8: Roadhouse Rumble 8 
| 
| align=center| 1
| align=center| 2:08
| Lethbridge, Alberta, Canada
| 
|-
| Win
| align=center| 10–2
| Troy Hadley
| TKO (punches)
| NFA: Super Brawl
| 
| align=center| 1
| align=center| N/A
| North Dakota, United States
| 
|-
| Win
| align=center| 9–2
| Chris Thiel
| KO (punches) 
| Ultimate Cage Wars 1
| 
| align=center| 1
| align=center| N/A
| Winnipeg, Manitoba, Canada
| 
|-
| Win
| align=center| 8–2
| Wyatt Lewis
| KO (punches)
| RITR 1: Rage in the Ring 1
| 
| align=center| 1
| align=center| N/A
| Lethbridge, Alberta, Canada
| 
|-
| Win
| align=center| 7–2
| Lee Mein
| TKO (submission to punches)
| WFF 7: Professional Shooto
| 
| align=center| 2
| align=center| 2:06
| Vancouver, British Columbia, Canada
| 
|-
| Loss
| align=center| 6–2
| Chris Tuchscherer
| Decision (unanimous)
| NFA: Moorhead
| 
| align=center| 3
| align=center| 3:00
| Minnesota, United States
| 
|-
| Win
| align=center| 6–1
| Dennis Stull
| TKO (punches)
| ICC: Trials 2 
| 
| align=center| 1
| align=center| N/A
| Minnesota, United States
| 
|-
| Win
| align=center| 5–1
| Jack Burton
| Submission (rear-naked choke)
| ICC: Trials 2 
| 
| align=center| 1
| align=center| N/A
| Minnesota, United States
| 
|-
| Win
| align=center| 4–1
| Matt Lafromboise
| TKO (submission to punches)
| DFC 1: Dakota Fighting Championships 1
| 
| align=center| 1
| align=center| 1:14
| North Dakota, United States
| 
|-
| Win
| align=center| 3–1
| Kyle Olsen
| Submission (exhaustion)
| NFA: Best Damn Fights
| 
| align=center| 1
| align=center| 4:55
| North Dakota, United States
| 
|-
| Win
| align=center| 2–1
| Ben Konecnec
| TKO (punches)
| IFA: Ultimate Trials
| 
| align=center| 1
| align=center| 0:26
| Iowa, United States
| 
|-
| Loss
| align=center| 1–1
| Jason Day
| Decision (unanimous)
| RR 8: Roadhouse Rumble 8 
| 
| align=center| 2
| align=center| 5:00
| Lethbridge, Alberta, Canada
| 
|-
| Win
| align=center| 1–0
| Matt Lafromboise
| TKO (submission to punches)
| Absolute Ada Fights 4
| 
| align=center| 1
| align=center| 3:23
| Minnesota, United States
|

References

External links 
Official UFC Profile
 

1977 births
Living people
Polish male mixed martial artists
Canadian male mixed martial artists
Light heavyweight mixed martial artists
Heavyweight mixed martial artists
Mixed martial artists utilizing judo
Mixed martial artists utilizing wrestling
Mixed martial artists utilizing Brazilian jiu-jitsu
Polish practitioners of Brazilian jiu-jitsu
Canadian practitioners of Brazilian jiu-jitsu
People from Stalowa Wola
Polish emigrants to Canada
Polish expatriate sportspeople in the United States
Polish expatriate sportspeople in Canada
Sportspeople from Temecula, California
Sportspeople from Podkarpackie Voivodeship
Sportspeople from Winnipeg
Ultimate Fighting Championship male fighters